is a Japanese manga series written and illustrated by Aya Hirakawa. It was serialized in Shogakukan's Weekly Shōnen Sunday from December 2014 to May 2018.

Plot
Akuto Ikurumi is the top of his class in every subject, including sports, and he knows it. The son of a well-known politician, a degree of arrogance is to be expected. But Akuto takes it to a new extreme with his condescending and self-important attitude. The friends he may have had in his elementary years have long since left his side, and it doesn't help matters that his effeminate voice makes him a target of constant ridicule by his "lower class" schoolmates. Then, Nari Harusaka enters his life, and Akuto's controlling personality is thrown off kilter by the optimistic but manipulating young seiyū. With his life on the line, he agrees to be a voice in her Anime Research Society's project for the upcoming cultural festival as the female lead.

Characters

A second year high school student who is perfect both academically and physically. Because of this and his father being a well-known and rich politician, he is arrogant and has a cold attitude.

An optimistic middle school student who works as a voice actress. She is considered a child prodigy in voice acting.

Manga
Tenshi to Akuto!! is written and illustrated by Aya Hirakawa. It was serialized in Shogakukan's shōnen manga magazine Weekly Shōnen Sunday from December 24, 2014 to May 30, 2018. The series was collected into seventeen tankōbon volumes published by Shogakukan from April 17, 2015 to August 17, 2018.

Volume list

See also
Kunisaki Izumo no Jijō, another manga series by the same author
Mikadono Sanshimai wa Angai, Choroi, another manga series by the same author

References

External links
Official website at Web Sunday 
 

Comedy anime and manga
Shogakukan manga
Shōnen manga